The 2011 Gator Bowl game was a post-season college football bowl game between the Mississippi State Bulldogs of the SEC and Michigan Wolverines of the Big Ten, and was played on January 1, 2011 (1:30 p.m. ET), at EverBank Field in Jacksonville, Florida. It was the 66th edition of the bowl game and was broadcast by ESPN2. It was the first time these two teams have ever met. After the game started fairly close, Mississippi State ultimately pulled away and routed Michigan 52–14. It was the most points ever scored by one team in the Gator Bowl, and the worst loss Michigan has ever suffered in any bowl game in its long history. Rich Rodriguez was fired by Michigan after the game, marking the beginning of the "Brady Hoke Era," as Hoke would be named Rodriguez's replacement as Michigan head coach.

Konica Minolta ended its sponsorship after the 2010 Gator Bowl game. On December 14, 2010, the Gator Bowl Association announced that Progressive Insurance would become the title sponsor for the 2011 Gator Bowl.

Teams

Mississippi State

Mississippi State, like their opponent, returned to a bowl game for the first time since following the 2007 season. The Bulldogs brought the nation's 16th ranked rushing offense to the contest.

Michigan

Michigan brought its high-powered offense into the Gator Bowl along with its 7–5 record. The Wolverines were led by quarterback Denard Robinson. The sophomore helped guide an offense that ranked sixth in the FBS with an average of 500.9 yards, and he set the NCAA record for most rushing yards by a quarterback with 1,643. Robinson was named the Big Ten's Offensive MVP for his efforts. Michigan returned to a bowl game after not appearing in the postseason in 2008 and 2009. This was the Wolverines' third appearance in the Gator Bowl and first since 1991. They were 1–1 in prior Gator Bowls.

Game summary
The game began as a seesaw affair between the two teams. Michigan struck first with Denard Robinson throwing a 10-yard pass to Roy Roundtree for a touchdown on the game's first drive. Mississippi State responded with a 4-yard touchdown pass from Chris Relf to Arceto Clark and a 42-yard field goal by Derek DePasquale. The field goal was the direct result of a blocked punt by Mississippi State. Michigan responded with a 27-yard touchdown reception by Martavious Odoms. After the first quarter ended, Michigan lead 14–10, but would not score any more points during the game. Mississippi State blew the game wide open in the second quarter with twenty-one points. Vick Ballard and Chris Relf both had rushing touchdowns, of two yards and one yard respectively, while Ricco Sanders also had a 15-yard touchdown reception for Mississippi State. By halftime, Mississippi State led 31–14 and showed no signs of slowing down. On the opening drive of the third quarter, Michigan's defense finally forced its first three and out, but on the subsequent drive, Brendan Gibbons missed a 35-yard field goal. The Bulldogs finished the game with twenty-one second half points. Fourteen of these came in the third quarter on two rushing touchdowns by Ballard of seven yards and one yard, while the final touchdown that made the score worse than the 1968 Ohio State-Michigan game came via a Relf 31-yard pass to Michael Carr in the fourth quarter.

The game broke several Gator Bowl records, as well as Michigan records. The twenty-four points scored in the first quarter broke the previous Gator Bowl record for most points in the first quarter, which was set in 2005 between West Virginia and Florida State. Denard Robinson finished the season with 4,272 yards of total offense, a Michigan single-season record. The game was also Michigan's worst loss in Michigan's history in a bowl game, with the previous record being a 45–17 loss to Tennessee in the 2002 Citrus Bowl. This was also Michigan's worst loss since losing 40-0 to Minnesota in 1935.

Scoring summary

Statistics

References

External links
 ESPN game summary
 Summary at Bentley Historical Library, University of Michigan Athletics History

Gator Bowl
Gator Bowl
Mississippi State Bulldogs football bowl games
Michigan Wolverines football bowl games
21st century in Jacksonville, Florida
Gator Bowl
January 2011 sports events in the United States